The North West Frontier Province cricket team was an Indian domestic cricket team representing the British Indian province of North-West Frontier Province. The team played in the Ranji Trophy from 1937–38 Indian cricket season until 1945–46 season in British India, before the partition of India.

The team first played first-class cricket in Ranji Trophy in the 1937 season against Southern Punjab team. The team continued to appear in the Ranji Trophy until the 1945/46 season, when it played its final first-class match against Delhi.

Following independence and the partition of India, the NWFP team competed in various national competitions in Pakistan. In 2010, the province was renamed "Khyber Pakhtunkhwa", and the cricket team was renamed accordingly.

References

Indian first-class cricket teams
Former senior cricket clubs of India
Cricket in Khyber Pakhtunkhwa
1887 establishments in India
Cricket clubs established in 1887